Abba Hor, Besoy (also known as Psoi and Absahi), and Daydara (also known as Didra or Theodora) were Christian martyrs in Egypt in the fourth century.

Hor was a soldier. With his brother Besoy, he confessed to his belief in Christianity at Alexandria during the Diocletian Persecution.

Hor was subjected to prolonged torture before being pierced by a lance. Besoy was decapitated. Daydara died while under torture.

They are regarded as saints, with a feast day of June 23 in the Coptic Church and the Assyrian Church of the East.

Besoy also has a separate feast day on August 24.

References

Holweck, F. G. A Biographical Dictionary of the Saints. St. Louis, MO: B. Herder Book Co. 1924.

Year of birth missing
4th-century deaths
4th-century Christian martyrs
4th-century Romans
Saints from Roman Egypt
Groups of Christian martyrs of the Roman era
Christians martyred during the reign of Diocletian